The Hyundai Lavita is a multi purpose vehicle (MPV) produced by the South Korean manufacturer Hyundai, from 2001 to 2010. It was also marketed as the Hyundai Matrix in Europe and Southeast Asia, and as the Hyundai Elantra LaVita in Australia. It was mechanically related to the Hyundai Elantra (XD) and was designed by the Italian company Pininfarina. 

Sales commenced in August 2001, and continued until the end of 2010, when it was replaced by the ix20.

Overview

The Lavita is a five-door, five-seater hatchback and is available in 1.5, 1.6 and 1.8-litre petrol engines. In Europe, there were versions also available with turbo diesel engines, these were available from September 2001.

In Malaysia, the Lavita was locally assembled as the Inokom Matrix, which is available in both 1.6L and 1.8L petrol engine options. Hyundai facelifted the model in 2005. For 2008, Hyundai unveiled a second facelifted version at the Geneva Motor Show in March 2008. 

It underwent major changes to the front fascia, similar in style to the first generation i30. New wheels were also part of the slew of changes. The C pillar window kink was eliminated. Minor changes were also made to the interior.

References

External links

Lavita
Cars introduced in 2001
Cars of Turkey
Mini MPVs
Front-wheel-drive vehicles